Panaqolus is a genus of small catfish in the family Loricariidae native to rivers in tropical South America. Its members were formerly thought to belong to a clade of small-sized species in the genus Panaque, until this genus was separated from Panaque in 2001. At times it has been considered a subgenus of Panaque, and the validity of the genus has been disputed by various authors and sources. Pseudoqolus koko was formerly considered to be a member of this genus, although it was reclassified as a member of the currently monotypic genus Pseudoqolus by Nathan K. Lujan, Christian A. Cramer, Raphael Covain, Sonia Fisch-Muller, and Hernán López-Fernández following a 2017 molecular phylogenetic analysis.

Species
There are currently 11 recognized species in this genus:
 Panaqolus albivermis Lujan, Steele & Velasquez, 2013
 Panaqolus albomaculatus (Kanazawa, 1958)
 Panaqolus changae (Chockley & Armbruster, 2002)
 Panaqolus claustellifer M. Tan, L. S. Souza & Armbruster, 2016
 Panaqolus dentex (Günther, 1868)
 Panaqolus gnomus (Schaefer & D. J. Stewart, 1993) 
 Panaqolus maccus (Schaefer & D. J. Stewart, 1993) 
 Panaqolus nix Cramer & Rapp Py-Daniel, 2015
 Panaqolus nocturnus (Schaefer & D. J. Stewart, 1993) 
 Panaqolus purusiensis (La Monte, 1935)
 Panaqolus tankei Cramer & L. M. de Sousa, 2016

References

Loricariidae
Fish of South America
Taxa named by Isaäc J. H. Isbrücker
Freshwater fish genera